Cyperus giganteus (also known as piripiri) is a perennial herbaceous plant. It belongs to the genus Cyperus. Its native range extends from Jalisco in west-central Mexico as far south as Uruguay, and also grows on some islands in the Caribbean (Cuba, Hispaniola, Puerto Rico, Jamaica, and Trinidad). The species is sparingly naturalized in eastern Texas and southern Louisiana.

References

giganteus
Plants described in 1805
Flora of Mexico
Flora of Central America
Flora of South America
Flora of the Caribbean
Taxa named by Martin Vahl